Hazel Tapales Orencio (born September 21, 1986) is a Filipina character actress best known for her award-winning performances in Philippine New Wave films by director Lav Diaz such as Mula sa Kung Ano ang Noon (From What is Before, 2014), Elehiya sa dumalaw mula sa himagsikan (Elegy to the Visitor from the Revolution, 2011), and Ang Panahon ng Halimaw (Season of the Devil, 2018).

See also 
 Lav Diaz
 Season of the Devil

References 

1986 births
Living people
21st-century Filipino actresses